Mingachevir is the fourth-largest city in Azerbaijan with a population of about 106,000. It's often called the "city of lights" because of its hydroelectric power station on the Kur River, which divides the city down the middle.

The current city was founded in 1948, partly by German prisoners of war captured during World War II. Mingechevir is also home to Mingachevir Polytechnic Institute. The city forms an administrative division of Azerbaijan. The district is located 323 km from Baku and 17 km from the Baku-Tbilisi railway. Geographically, the region is located in the center of the republic on both sides of the Kura River.

History

The archaeological history of this area extends from the eneolith era (3000 BC) to the AD 17th century. In 1871, Adolf Berge, chairman of the Caucasus archaeological committee, gave information about the archaeological monuments of Mingachevir at the second congress of archaeologists in St Petersburg. wrongfully presenting Mingachevir as an ancient settlement.

After this, Mingachevir remained out of archaeologists' attention until the mid-1930s when archaeological researches resumed as part of the construction of the hydroelectric power station. In 1935, researches under the leadership of Prof. Pakhomov revealed two ancient settlements and cemeteries, which were composed of various types of graves. Unfortunately, World War II prevented the research from being completed.

The construction of the hydroelectric power station started immediately after the war. This marked the start of systematic and planned research of Mingachevir as an ancient settlement. Archaeological excavations were carried out from April 1946 to August 1953 by a group of archaeologists headed by S. M. Qaziyev in connection with the construction of the Mingachevir hydroelectric power station under a decision by the Supreme Board of the Azerbaijani Academy of Sciences. Over 20,000 historical monuments – graves and tumuli, means of production, things related to daily life, jewellery etc., which reflected historical periods in chronological sequence, were found during the excavations.

Most ancient written monuments in Caucasian Albanian alphabet and other archaeological finds proved that Mingachevir was a 5,000-year-old settlement. The majority of these finds are currently exhibited in the Azerbaijani Historical Museum, while part of them is held at the Mingachevir Historical Museum.

Historical sources indicate that a fierce battle took place between the powerful army of Roman commander Pompey and the army of Albanian governor Oris just on the territory of the current dam on the bank of the River Kur in the 1st century BC. Historical facts also prove that the ancient Silk Road ran via Mingachevir.

Renowned Turkish traveller Evliya Çelebi, who lived in the 17th century AD, wrote about Mingachevir and described it as a large settlement on the right bank of the River Kur near the Bozdag Mountain. According to him, several mosques, workshops manufacturing fibre silk and silk cloth, bathhouses etc. were operating in this settlement. The road passing from there used to be called the "road of the messenger". The "road of the messenger" connected camelcase and trade roads to Middle East countries and Azerbaijani towns like Saki, Qabala, Samaxi, Barda, Beylaqan and others.

A great number of people came to Mingachevir from all districts in Azerbaijan in connection with the construction of the Mingachevir hydroelectric power station, and a total of 20,000 people took part in the construction of this power station. About 10,000 German POWs were among those who contributed to the construction of the power station by the end of the 1940s. The most experienced specialists of the country were involved in the construction of this building site as the biggest hydroelectric power station of the then Soviet Union.

Today's Mingachevir was granted the status of city in 1948. The population of the town currently stands at 120,000 people, including 20,000 Azerbaijani settlers from Karabakh. The area of the town is 139.53 km2. Mingachevir is situated 55 meters above sea level on the foothill of the southeast of the Bozdag Mountain chain and on the edge of the Mingachevir reservoir in the Kur-Araz lowland in central Azerbaijan. The town was built in a mild and warm zone and has warm and dry summers and mild winters. The average annual temperature is 14 - 15 °C, highest temperature 42 °C (July–August) and the lowest temperature (January–February) -10 °C. The average annual rainfall is 250–300 mm.

The town lies on both banks of the River Kur - a 1515 km-long river, which is the biggest and longest one in the South Caucasus. (The river originates from Turkey, runs down Georgia and Azerbaijan and flows to the Caspian Sea.) Mingachevir is situated 280–300 km west of the capital of the republic, Baku.

Mingachevir has been developing speedily over the last 54 years since it has been established. It is currently considered to be the fourth city of the country both for its economic potential and the number of inhabitants, it is one of the most important cities of the republic in terms of energy, industry, science, education and culture.
The number of able-bodied people in Mingachevir is 53,000, while the number of people actually involved in labour is 16,000. The number of people engaged in small-sized businesses stands at
4,000 people

Economy 
As of 2008, Mingachevir fish farm functions in the city, which farms three types of fishes, including carp, silver carp and sturgeon.

Reservoir and Hydroelectric power station 

The construction of the Mingachevir Dam creating the Mingachevir reservoir and Mingachevir Hydro Power Plant was completed in 1953. The hydroelectric power stations soil dam, whose total capacity is 15.6 cubic kilometers of water, is one of the highest dams in Europe that was constructed through sprinkling. The reservoir is located 3 km north-west of the district. The length of the reservoir is 70 km, width from 3 to 18 km, deepest point about 75 meters and total area 605 km2.

Apart from the River Kur, the reservoir feeds two channels of the 172 km-long Upper Qarabag Channel and the 123 km-long Upper Sirvan Channel. These channels are used to irrigate 10,000 square kilometres of area in the steppes of Mil, Mugan and Sirvan. The Varvara reservoir and the Varvara hydroelectric power station are in 20 km east of the Mingachevir reservoir on the River Kur. The volume of the Varvara hydroelectric power station's energy blocks is 16 MW.

Demographics

Ethnic groups 
According to the 2009 census, the total population of the city is 96,304, including 95,700 Azerbaijanis, 413 Russians, 52 Lezgins and others.

Religion 

 Muslim 95%
 Other 5%

Climate 
Mingachevir has a semi-arid climate (Köppen climate classification: BSk) near the borderline of a humid subtropical climate (Köppen climate classification: Cfa) because its fairly evenly distributed average annual precipitation is just below the 400 mm threshold, apart from the average annual temperature range.

Culture 

The Davudova Mingacevir State Theatre was established on the basis of folk theatre in 1969. Every clubhouse has its own ensemble. There are also singing and music circles, as well as training courses on computers, tailoring, board games and arts in the clubhouses. There are 8 clubhouses, including the Martyr Azar Niftaliyev clubhouse, Samad Vurgun clubhouse, Nariman Narimanov clubhouse and others, in the town.

Museums 
The Mingacevir Historical Museum was established in January 1968. The museum has two branches – Martyrs’ Memorial and Independence Museum. The museum has 14,461 exhibits. The city is also home to Mingachevir Gallery, which includes 310 works of art by Azerbaijani and Russian artists, including works by Mikhail Vrubel and Ilya Repin.

Music and media 
There are 3 musical schools – Hacibayov School, Bulbul School and Martyr Qasimov School functioning in the city. The study in these schools lasts 7 years. A total of 1,500 students attend these schools, and 350 professional teachers train them. The schools have different courses on national musical instruments such as tar, kamancha, nagara, saz, and others like, piano, violin and vocal.

The regional channel Mingachevir TV is headquartered in the city.

Parks 

The city has many parks, including Sahil Park and Friendship Park.

Sports 

The city has one professional football team, Energetik, competing in the top-flight of Azerbaijani football - the Azerbaijan First Division.

The city also contains high modern rowing Kur Sport and Rowing Centre, which was renovated and unveiled in 2010. The venue expected to host canoe sprint at 2015 European Games.

Transportation

Public system 

Mingachevir's trolleybus system at its height, it consisted of three lines and existed until 2005.

Education 
Mingachevir State University, founded in 1991, is the oldest Azerbaijani educational institution in the city. Although originally part of Azerbaijan State Oil Academy, the institute became independent in 1991. Mingachevir Medical School, founded in 1991, includes 17 study halls for anatomy, therapy, surgery and pediatrics. The city also includes the local branch of the Azerbaijani Teachers Training Institute.

Notable natives 
Other notable residents include: politician Aydin Mirzazade

Twin towns – sister cities

Mingachevir is twinned with:
 Gölbaşı, Turkey (2007)
 Polotsk, Belarus (2012)
 Kars, Turkey (2013)
 Afula, Israel (2015)
 Kahramanmaraş, Turkey (2017)
 Orhangazi, Turkey

See also 
 Shaki
 Lankaran
 Nakchivan
 Sumgait

References

External links 
 

 
Populated places in Azerbaijan
Cities and towns built in the Soviet Union
Populated places established in 1946